The Lötschberg Tunnel is a  long railway tunnel on the Lötschberg Line, which connects Spiez and Brig at the northern end of the Simplon Tunnel cutting through the Bernese Alps of Switzerland. Its ends are at the towns of Kandersteg (2 km away) in the canton of Berne and Goppenstein in the canton of Valais.

Construction began in 1907 and suffered delays by several severe accidents.
 February 1908: An avalanche destroyed a hotel that the workers lived in, killing 13.
 July 1908: The tunnel broke into a deep fissure below the Gasterntal valley and flooded with water and glacial deposit from the fissure, killing 25, and 1554 meters (5100 feet, 0.9656 mile) of the tunnel had to be abandoned and sealed off and replaced by a curved bypass.
 March 1911: Breakthrough was achieved
 3 June 1913: Finalization
 15 July 1913: Regular service through the Lötschberg Tunnel began in 1913.

The tunnel is a single bore twin track.

The BLS AG company offers a car transport service through the tunnel, between Kandersteg station and Goppenstein station, for accompanied vehicles. The journey time of approximately 20 minutes, passengers remain in their cars in open sided car transport vehicles. At peak times, the car transport service operates in each direction every 7½ minutes.

See also 
Lötschberg
Lötschberg Base Tunnel
Simplon Tunnel
NRLA

References

Further reading

 Baumgartner, B., and M. Lortscher. 2007. "Commissioning of the Lotschberg Base Tunnel". Elektrische Bahnen; Zentralblatt F̐ưur Elektrischen Zugbetrieb Und Alle Arten Von Triebfahrzeugen Mit Elektrischem Antrieb. no. 6: 345-350. 
 Lortscher, M., et al. "Electric Installations in the Lotschberg Base Tunnel." Elektrische Bahnen; Zentralblatt F̐ưur Elektrischen Zugbetrieb Und Alle Arten Von Triebfahrzeugen Mit Elektrischem Antrieb. 6 (2007): 323-344. 
 Pesendorfer, M., and S. Loew. 2004. "Hydrogeologic Exploration During Excavation of the Lotschberg Base Tunnel (AlpTransit Switzerland)". Lecture Notes in Earth Sciences. no. 104: 347-358. 
 Vuilleumier, F., A. Weatherill, and B. Crausaz. 2002. "Safety Aspects of Railway and Road Tunnel: Example of the Lotschberg Railway Tunnel and Mont-Blanc Road Tunnel". Tunnelling and Underground Space Technology. 17, no. 2: 153-158.
 2000. "Lötschberg Base Tunnel Will Open Up Low-Level High-Cube Route in 2007". Railway Gazette International. 156: 175-182. 
 2002. "TUNNELS - Lotschberg Team Advances Swiftly Through the Alps - Teams Using TBMs and Drill-and-Blast Methods Drive Tunnel That Will Speed Trucks Through Switzerland". ENR.. 249, no. 3: 28. 
 2005. "Tracklaying Reaches Halfway in the Lötschberg Base Tunnel". Railway Gazette International. 161, no. 12: 773-775.

External links

Railway tunnels in Switzerland
Buildings and structures in Valais
Bernese Oberland
Tunnels completed in 1913
Transport in the canton of Bern
Bern–Valais border
1913 establishments in Switzerland
Tunnels in the Alps